Pseudoharpax virescens, common name Gambian spotted-eye flower mantis, is a species of praying mantis native to western, central and eastern Africa.
It takes its name from two eye spots on the dorsal side of the abdomen of adult females.

Description
  
Pseudoharpax virescens mimic flowers.  They are mostly white with green wings and have pointy eyes. Pseudoharpax virescens are small for a mantis, around 3 centimeters in length as adults.  1st instar nymphs are almost 4 millimeters in length. The color of Pseudoharpax virescens eyes change night to day.  At night their eyes are dark red, during the day their eyes are light green.  Oothecae can be 5 millimeters to 15 millimeters long.

Sexual dimorphism
Females are usually about 28 millimeters in length, while males are usually about 25 millimeters.  Females have short antennae, while males have long and red antennae.  Females are bulkier than males. Eight segments can be counted on the underside of the abdomen of a male and six on that of the female.  Females have two dots on their abdomens as adults, while males, whose abdomens are thin and covered completely by their wings when looked at from above, appear to have none.

Subspecies
There are two subspecies in this species.
P. v. centralis (La Greca, 1954) - found in central and eastern Africa
P. v. virescens (Serville, 1839) - found in western and central Africa

See also
List of mantis genera and species
Flower mantis

References

Hymenopodidae
Mantodea of Africa
Insects described in 1839